Sarqanat or Sar Qanat may refer to:
 Sarqanat, Bushehr
 Sarqanat, Hamaijan, Sepidan County, Fars Province
 Sar Qanat, Sornabad, Sepidan County, Fars Province
 Sar Qanat-e Qobad Chenar, Kohgiluyeh and Boyer-Ahmad Province